SASA may refer to:

 Saginaw Arts and Sciences Academy, a small public high school and middle school for developmentally advanced children in Saginaw, Michigan
 Scottish Agricultural Science Agency, formerly an executive agency of the Scottish Executive Environment and Rural Affairs Department
 Serbian Academy of Sciences and Arts, the most prominent academic institution in Serbia
 Slovenian Academy of Sciences and Arts, the national academy of Slovenia
 Solvent Accessible Surface Area, a measure of the solvent accessible surface area of a biomolecule
 Scouts South Africa, formerly known as the Scout Association of South Africa
 South African Speleological Association, a caving organization
 Student Achievement and School Accountability Programs, a program in the U.S. Department of Education
 Martín Miguel de Güemes International Airport, Argentina (ICAO code: SASA)
 SASA Impact FC, a Canadian women's soccer team